This article comprises three sortable tables of major mountain peaks of the United States of America.

The summit of a mountain or hill may be measured in three main ways:
The topographic elevation of a summit measures the height of the tip of a mountain above a geodetic sea level.  The first table below ranks the 100 highest major summits of the United States by elevation.
The topographic prominence of a summit is a measure of how high the summit rises above its surroundings.  The second table below ranks the 50 most prominent summits of the United States.
The topographic isolation (or radius of dominance) of a summit measures how far the summit lies from its nearest point of equal elevation.  The third table below ranks the 50 most isolated major summits of the United States.



Highest major summits

Of the 100 highest major summits of the United States, only Denali exceeds  elevation, four peaks exceed , and all 100 peaks exceed  elevation. 

Of these 100 summits, 53 are located in Colorado, 23 in Alaska, 14 in California, five in Wyoming, two in Hawaii, and one each in Washington, Utah, and New Mexico.  Five of these summits are located on the international border between Alaska and Yukon, and one is located on the international border between Alaska and British Columbia.  The ten highest major summits of the United States are all located in Alaska.

Most prominent summits

Of the 50 most prominent summits of the United States, only Denali exceeds  of topographic prominence, three peaks exceed , ten peaks exceed , 45 peaks exceed , and all 50 peaks exceed  of topographic prominence.  All of these peaks are ultra-prominent summits.

Of these 50 peaks, 27 are located in Alaska, five in Washington, five in California, three in Hawaii, three in Wyoming, two in Nevada, two in Oregon, and one each in Colorado, Utah, and Arizona.  Three of these summits lie on the international border between Alaska and Yukon, and one lies on the international border between Alaska and British Columbia.

Most isolated major summits

Of the 50 most isolated major summits of the United States, only Denali exceeds  of topographic isolation, Mauna Kea exceeds , Mount Whitney exceeds , seven peaks exceed , 12 peaks exceed , 44 peaks exceed , and all 50 peaks exceed  of topographic isolation.

Of these 50 peaks, 18 are located in Alaska, four in California, three in Washington, two in Hawaii, two in Colorado, two in Wyoming, two in Arizona, two in Nevada, two in Utah, two in New York, two in Oregon, and one each in North Carolina, New Hampshire, Arkansas, West Virginia, New Mexico, Maine, Idaho, South Dakota, and Montana.  One of these summits lies on the international border between Alaska and British Columbia.

See also

List of mountain peaks of North America
List of mountain peaks of Greenland
List of mountain peaks of Canada
List of mountain peaks of the Rocky Mountains

List of mountains of the United States
List of the highest major summits of the United States
List of the major 4000-meter summits of the United States
List of the major 3000-meter summits of the United States
List of United States fourteeners
List of the most prominent summits of the United States
List of the ultra-prominent summits of the United States
List of the most isolated major summits of the United States
List of the major 100-kilometer summits of the United States
List of extreme summits of the United States
List of mountain peaks of Alaska
List of mountain peaks of Arizona
List of mountain peaks of California
List of mountain peaks of Colorado
List of mountain peaks of Hawaii
List of mountain peaks of Idaho
List of mountain peaks of Montana
List of mountain peaks of Nevada
List of mountain peaks of New Mexico
List of mountain peaks of Oregon
List of mountain peaks of Utah
List of mountain peaks of Washington (state)
List of mountain peaks of Wyoming
List of mountain peaks of México
List of mountain peaks of Central America
List of mountain peaks of the Caribbean
United States of America
Geography of the United States
Geology of the United States
:Category:Mountains of the United States
commons:Category:Mountains of the United States
Physical geography
Topography
Topographic elevation
Topographic prominence
Topographic isolation

Notes

References

External links

United States Geological Survey (USGS)
Geographic Names Information System @ USGS
United States National Geodetic Survey (NGS)
Geodetic Glossary @ NGS
NGVD 29 to NAVD 88 online elevation converter @ NGS
Survey Marks and Datasheets @ NGS
Bivouac.com
Peakbagger.com
Peaklist.org
Peakware.com
Summitpost.org

 Peaks
 
United States, List Of Mountain Peaks Of The
United States, List Of Mountain Peaks Of The
United States, List Of Mountain Peaks Of The